Thozha, literally "friend" in Tamil, may refer to:
Thozha (2008 film), directed by N. Sundaresan
Oopiri, a 2016 Telugu film, titled Thozha in Tamil, directed by Vamsi Paidipally